Gadwal sari is a handcrafted woven sari style in Gadwal of Jogulamba Gadwal district in the Indian state of Telangana. It was registered as one of the geographical indication from Telangana by Geographical Indications of Goods (Registration and Protection) Act, 1999. They are most notable for the Zari on the saris. The sari consists of cotton body with silk pallu which is also given a new name as Sico saris. The weave is so light that the saree can be packed in a matchbox.
The Brahmotsavas of Tirupati begin with the deity's idol being adorned with Gadwal Saree.

Gadwal Handloom Centre
Gadwal Handloom Centre, established in 1946 by the late Ratan Babu Rao, was mainly responsible for the widespread knowledge and detail regarding the Gadwal Sari.

See also
Ilkal saree
Mysore silk

References

Saris
Mahbubnagar district
Culture of Telangana
Geographical indications in Telangana